Valeriia Baranik (born ; November 17, 1993) is a Russian handballer playing in the Turkish Women's Handball Super League for Muratpaşa Bld. SK and the Russia national team. The -tall sportswoman is line player.

She played for HC Lada Togliatti and Rostov-Don in her country and for BNTU Minsk in Belarus before she transferred to the Antalya-based team Muratpaşa Bld. SK in July 2015.

References

1993 births
People from Syzran
Russian female handball players
Russian expatriate sportspeople in Belarus
Russian expatriate sportspeople in Turkey
Expatriate handball players in Turkey
Muratpaşa Bld. SK (women's handball) players
Living people
Sportspeople from Samara Oblast